Bark River is a  river on the Upper Peninsula of the U.S. state of Michigan.

The Bark River was named by some of the first railroad engineers in the area who saw a great quantity of bark floating on the water.

References

Rivers of Michigan
Rivers of Delta County, Michigan
Tributaries of Lake Michigan